Senator Stivers may refer to:

John D. Stivers (1861–1935), New York State Senate
Robert Stivers (born 1961), Kentucky State Senate
Steve Stivers (born 1965), Ohio State Senate